Wingfield Aerodrome was first the Cape Town Municipal Aerodrome, then Air Force Station Wingfield under the SAAF, before being used as a Fleet Air Arm base by the Royal Navy. After World War II, the aerodrome reverted to being the municipal airport for a while. The history of Wingfield is synonymous with the history of flight in South Africa, including pioneering attempts at commercial aviation.

Early landing grounds in the Cape
In the early days of aviation, all that was required for take off and landing was a level piece of land relatively free of obstructions.  Where a flight commenced and ended depended on the weather, the reason for the flight, the mechanical state of the aircraft and even the whim of the pilot.

Navigation was done by following a road or railway line and referring to prominent landmarks such as Table Mountain.

There were no laws prohibiting low flying or landing within city limits.

Places in the vicinity of Cape Town known to be used as airfields included Kenilworth race course, Green Point Common and Green Point cycle track, Sea Point, Robben Island, Maitland Common, Rosebank Showgrounds and Mr Young's farm near Wynberg as well as local beaches.

It would be several years before the commercial prospects of aviation would be grasped and an aviation infrastructure put in place.

World War II
Following the outbreak of World War II former Cape Town mayor and businessman, David Pieter de Villiers Graaff, sold the land to the government to aid the war effort on condition that it would revert to his estate when the war was concluded and the government had no further military use for it. This led to the establishment of the Wingfield Aerodrome.

September 1939 saw the formation of 15 Squadron SAAF at Germiston with three former SAA Junkers Ju 86 airliners used for maritime patrols.

In 1939, Alex Henshaw, Chief Test Pilot for Britain's Spitfire fighter planes, flying a modified Percival Mew Gull registration number G-AEXF, set a number of records for solo flights between Gravesend, Kent (now RAF Gravesend) and Wingfield and back, which still stands today nearly seventy years later.

The present
The SA Navy is to relocate its sprawling technical training school, SAS Wingfield, along with some depots from a run-down World War II-era site near Goodwood to a purpose built new facility at Simon’s Town. 
 
The move – for which the Navy has already received an initial R40 million – follows a comprehensive multiyear investigation into the rationalisation of the Navy’s training institutions.

The SAS Wingfield Naval Unit continues to exercise its right to the Freedom of Goodwood annually "to enter and march in the town with colours flying, drums beating and bayonets fixed".

Municipal Aerodrome
Cape Town International Airport is now the primary airport serving the city of Cape Town, and is the second busiest airport in South Africa and third busiest in Africa. The airport was opened in 1954 to replace Cape Town's previous airport at Wingfield.

Goodwood Correctional Centre
On 17 October 1997 one of the most modern prisons in South Africa, the Goodwood Correctional Centre, with a capacity of 1692 beds was officially opened.  It was built on Wingfield land to the north of the N1 highway.  It is aligned to the concept of rehabilitation.

Acacia Park
In 1947 a township called Sassar was erected on a portion of Wingfield Aerodrome for the accommodation of officials of the South African Railways and Harbours. From 1948 it also provided accommodation for civil servants and members of Parliament who annually migrate to Cape Town for the parliamentary session.

On 1 December 1959, after a competition for a new name, the name was changed to Acacia Park on account of the many Port Jackson willow trees growing there. A primary school was built and provision made for sport and other recreational facilities.

At that stage children in the primary school were taught in accordance with the Transvaal syllabus and under the control of the Transvaal Education Department.

Acacia Park is currently one of three Parliamentary villages in Cape Town.

References

External links
Photograph of an SAA Skymaster Leaving Wingfield Airport, Cape Town (1950)

Further reading
 This is the definitive history of Wingfield as a civilian and military aerodrome, particularly as part of the host of Southern African aerodromes that played an important role in training pilots and aircrew as part of the worldwide British Commonwealth Air Training Plan during World War II.

Military history of South Africa during World War II
South African Air Force bases
Airports of the British Commonwealth Air Training Plan
Fleet Air Arm
Royal Naval Air Stations
World War II sites in South Africa
Transport in Cape Town